Charles & Eddie were an American soul music duo composed of Charles Pettigrew and Eddie Chacon. Their single "Would I Lie to You?", taken from their 1992 debut album, Duophonic, won Ivor Novello Awards in 1993 in the Best Contemporary Song, Best Selling Song and International Hit of the Year categories. Between 1992 and 1995 they hit the top 40 three more times in the UK.

Career as a duo
Pettigrew and Chacon were said to have met on the New York City Subway in 1990, on the C train; according to Chacon, one of them was carrying a vinyl copy of the Marvin Gaye album Trouble Man. They released their debut album, Duophonic, on Capitol Records in 1992. It includes the singles "Would I Lie to You?", "N.Y.C." and "House Is Not a Home", and was influenced by classic soul music. 

Their second and final album, Chocolate Milk, included "Wounded Bird", which was written and recorded for the film True Romance. It was released in 1995. The duo split amicably in 1997.

Members

Charles Pettigrew

Pettigrew was born and raised in Philadelphia. He studied jazz singing at Berklee College of Music in Boston, and was lead singer of the band Down Avenue, who won WBCN's 1985 Rock 'n Roll Rumble.

In 1998, Pettigrew toured with Tom Tom Club (featuring Chris Frantz and Tina Weymouth from Talking Heads) and went on to join the group, co-writing and singing on several songs until he became too ill to perform.

In the late 1990s, Pettigrew was diagnosed with cancer. He died from the disease on April 6, 2001, at the age of 37.

Eddie Chacon
Chacon was raised in Hayward and Castro Valley, California. He started his first band at age 12 with neighborhood friends Cliff Burton (later of Metallica) and Mike Bordin (later of Faith No More). In his early 20s, Chacon worked as a songwriter for CBS Songs. He made albums for Columbia and Luther Campbell of 2 Live Crew, both of which went unreleased, along with demos made with the Dust Brothers. After splitting with Pettigrew, he worked as a photographer and creative director. 

On May 29, 2020, The Fader announced Chacon's return to music after two decades of silence as a singer, referring to him as a "low-key R&B legend". Chacon released the single "My Mind Is Out of Its Mind" from his forthcoming LP, Pleasure, Joy and Happiness on Day End Records. The project is produced and co-written by Solange collaborator John Carroll Kirby and distributed by Light in the Attic Records. On July 15 2020, KCRW premiered the album's second single, "Trouble". They wrote: "Eddie Chacon’s R & B pop exploits are both influential and legendary." On July 29 2020, The New York Times said: "The album avoids the trappings of a throwback or revival of a bygone era, instead exploring the rarely glimpsed side of that genre’s themes of passion and heartbreak, sung by a bruised but wiser man." Mojo magazine wrote: “Neo-Soul veteran returns with a mini modern masterpiece.” In 2020 he released a single, "High", with Stones Throw Records' John Carroll Kirby and harpist Nailah Hunter.

Discography

Albums

Singles

Soundtracks
1993: "Wounded Bird" (True Romance soundtrack)
1993: "Supernatural Thing" (Addams Family Values soundtrack)
1993: "I Would Stop the World" (Super Mario Bros. soundtrack)

References

American contemporary R&B musical groups
American musical duos
American soul musical groups
Capitol Records artists
Contemporary R&B duos
Male musical duos
Musical groups established in 1990
Musical groups disestablished in 1995